Bellens is a surname. Notable people with the surname include:

Didier Bellens (1955–2016), Belgian businessman
Jacob Bellens (born 1979), Danish rock band member
Rita Bellens (born 1962), Belgian politician

See also
Bellen (surname)